Rosario de amor is a Mexican telenovela produced by Guillermo Diazayas for Televisa in 1978.

Cast 
Chela Castro as Elena Palacios
Pedro Armendáriz Jr. as Pablo Santacruz
Anita Blanch as Flora
Fernando Larrañaga
Graciela Castro

References

External links 

Mexican telenovelas
1978 telenovelas
Televisa telenovelas
Spanish-language telenovelas
1978 Mexican television series debuts
1978 Mexican television series endings